Jacksonport may refer to:

Places
United States
Jacksonport, Arkansas, a town
Jacksonport, Wisconsin, a town
Jacksonport (community), Wisconsin, an unincorporated community
West Jacksonport, Wisconsin, an unincorporated community